Anastasiya Nikolaevna Nemolyaeva (was born 30 June 1969) is Soviet and Russian film and theater actress, designer.

Biography
Anastasiya Nemolyaeva was born June 30, 1969 in Moscow into the family of a cinematographer Nikolai Nemolyaev, brother of the popular actress Svetlana Nemolyaeva. Anastasiya's grandfather Vladimir Nemolyaev was a director, known for the films Happy Flight, Doktor Aybolit, etc., and her grandmother had a lifelong career as a sound engineer at the Mosfilm.

As a child, Anastasiya was fond of painting and embroidery. She glued toys and covered the kitchen boards with oil paints. Anastasiya actively acted in films as a teenager. In 1991 Anastasiya graduated from Russian Academy of Theatre Arts (acting course of Mark Zakharov). During her studies, she starred in several films, two of which - Courier and Intergirl which brought Anastasiya her the most fame. From 1995 to 1999 she played in the theater on Malaya Bronnaya.

Personal life
Anastasiya Nemolyaeva is married to Benjamin Skalnik and has three children. Together with her husband she is engaged in design business. Anastasiya  actively cooperates with many well-known galleries in Moscow. Her work (glass, wood, furniture) are in private collections in Russia, France, Great Britain, Japan, Italy and other countries. Several works by Nemolyaeva are in the Russian Museum of Naïve Art. In 2005 Anastasiya  took part in the "Cow Parade" art event in Moscow.

Currently Anastasiya is not working in the theater and is only occasionally in films. Together with her husband she opened her own "Anastasiya Nemolyaeva's Art Studio" and "Benjamin Skalnik's Workshop", where he works as a designer in the art of painting on glass and wood (furniture, dishes), as well painting murals.

Selected filmography
 The Old New Year (1980)  as Lisa Sebeykina
 Courier (1986)  as Katya
 Intergirl (1989)  as Lyalya
 The Assassin of the Tsar (1991)  as nurse
 Dreams of Russia (1992)  as Tatiana
 Transit (2006)  as  Irina Zareva

References

External links

1969 births
Soviet film actresses
Russian film actresses
Russian Academy of Theatre Arts alumni
Actresses from Moscow
Living people